The 2012 Internazionali Tennis Val Gardena Südtirol was a professional tennis tournament played in Ortisei, Italy between 5 and 11 November 2012 on carpet courts. It was the third edition of the tournament which was part of the 2012 ATP Challenger Tour.

Singles main-draw entrants

Seeds

 1 Rankings are as of October 29, 2012.

Other entrants
The following players received wildcards into the singles main draw:
  Simone Bolelli
  Laurynas Grigelis
  Patrick Prader
  Andreas Seppi

The following players received entry from the qualifying draw:
  Marin Draganja
  Sandro Ehrat
  Pierre-Hugues Herbert
  Alessandro Petrone

Champions

Singles

 Benjamin Becker def.  Andreas Seppi, 6–1, 6–4

Doubles

 Karol Beck /  Rik de Voest def.  Rameez Junaid /  Michael Kohlmann, 6–3, 6–4

External links
Official Website

Internazionali Tennis Val Gardena Sudtirol
Internazionali Tennis Val Gardena Südtirol
2012 in Italian tennis